Astralium danieli is a species of sea snail, a marine gastropod mollusk in the family Turbinidae, the turban snails.

Description

Distribution
This marine species occurs off Bali, Indonesia.

References

 Alf & Kreipl. 2006. Spixiana Volume: 29 Issue: 1 Pages: 91–93
 Alf A. & Kreipl K. (2011) The family Turbinidae. Subfamilies Turbininae Rafinesque, 1815 and Prisogasterinae Hickman & McLean, 1990. In: G.T. Poppe & K. Groh (eds), A Conchological Iconography. Hackenheim: Conchbooks. pp. 1–82, pls 104–245

danieli
Gastropods described in 2006